SS Hornby was a tug tender which was based at Liverpool. She was built by John Cran & Co. at Leith, and launched on 22 January 1908. On 2 April 1912, Titanic was completed. Hornby tended to her again, this time during her sea trials. In 1935, Hornby was sold to the Newport Screw Towing Co., and renamed Holman. Then in 1961, she was broken up at Newport, Monmouthshire, UK.

References

1908 ships
Ships built in Leith
Tugboats of the United Kingdom
RMS Titanic